Dr. Charles A. Foster House is a historic home located at Glens Falls, Warren County, New York.  It was built in 1889 and is an asymmetrical, -story, stone and frame Queen Anne style residence.  It features a 1-story stone porch and cylindrical 2-story tower with conical roof.

It was added to the National Register of Historic Places in 1984.

See also
 National Register of Historic Places listings in Warren County, New York

References

Houses on the National Register of Historic Places in New York (state)
Queen Anne architecture in New York (state)
Houses completed in 1889
Houses in Warren County, New York
National Register of Historic Places in Warren County, New York